Roystonea stellata is an extinct species of palm endemic to Yagruma terrace in the Maisí region of Guantánamo Province in eastern Cuba.  The species is known from only a single collection made by French-born botanist Frère León in 1939.

Description
The  inflorescences bears white male and female flowers. The single known collection is not complete enough for a complete description.

Status
No specimens have been found in repeated surveys of its habitat since the 1990s, and thus R. stellata is probably extinct.

References

Trees of Cuba
stellata
Extinct plants
Endemic flora of Cuba